The Roskilde Festival 2019 was held on 29 June to 6 July 2019 in Roskilde, Denmark. The headliners included Bob Dylan, Travis Scott, Robyn, and The Cure.

Line-up
Headline performers are listed in Boldface. Artists listed from latest to earliest set times.

Orange Stage

{{Hidden
| headercss = color:#ffffff; background: #FF6200; font-size: 100%; width: 95%;;
| contentcss = text-align: left; font-size: 100%; width: 95%;;
| header = Orange Stage set lists
| content =

{{hidden
| headercss = color:#ffffff; background: #FD9346; font-size: 100%; width: 95%;;
| contentcss = text-align: left; font-size: 100%; width: 95%;;
| header = Bob Dylan
| content =

"Things Have Changed"
"It Ain't Me Babe"
"Highway 61 Revisited"
"Simple Twist of Fate"
"Cry a While"
"Honest with Me"
"Make You Feel My Love"
"Pay in Blood"
"Like a Rolling Stone"
"Early Roman Kings"
"Girl from the North Country"
"Love Sick"
"Thunder on the Mountain"
"Soon After Midnight"
"Gotta Serve Somebody"

Encore
"Blowin' in the Wind"
"It Takes a Lot to Laugh, It Takes a Train to Cry"

}}

{{hidden
| headercss = color:#ffffff; background: #FDB777; font-size: 100%; width: 95%;;
| contentcss = text-align: left; font-size: 100%; width: 95%;;
| header = MØ
| content =

"Purple Like the Summer Rain"
"Imaginary Friend"
"I Want You"
"Kamikaze"
"Pilgrim"
"Get It Right"
"Red Wine"
"West Hollywood"
"Waste of Time"
"Glass"
"Nights with You"
"Nostalgia"
"Say You'll Be There" 
"Turn My Heart to Stone"
"Beautiful Wreck"
"Blur"
"Mercy"
"Way Down"
"Lean On"

Encore
"Never Wanna Know"
"Don't Leave"
"Final Song"

}}
{{hidden
| headercss = color:#ffffff; background: #FDA766; font-size: 100%; width: 95%;;
| contentcss = text-align: left; font-size: 100%; width: 95%;;
| header = Robyn
| content =

"Send to Robin Immediately"
"Honey"
"Indestructible"
"Ever Again"
"Be Mine!"
"Because It's in the Music"
"Between the Lines"
"Love Is Free"
"Don't Fucking Tell Me What to Do"
"Dancing On My Own"
"Missing U"
"Call Your Girlfriend"

Encore
"With Every Heartbeat"
"Who Do You Love?"

}}

{{hidden
| headercss = color:#ffffff; background: #FD9346; font-size: 100%; width: 95%;;
| contentcss = text-align: left; font-size: 100%; width: 95%;;
| header = The Cure
| content =

"Shake Dog Shake"
"From the Edge of the Deep Green Sea"
"Just One Kiss"
"Lovesong"
"Last Dance"
"Pictures of You"
"High"
"A Night Like This"
"Burn"
"Fascination Street"
"Never Enough"
"Push"
"In Between Days"
"Just Like Heaven"
"Play for Today"
"A Forest"
"Primary"
"Want"
"39"
"One Hundred Years"

Encore
"Lullaby"
"The Caterpillar"
"The Walk"
"Friday I'm in Love"
"Close to Me"
"Why Can't I Be You?"
"Boys Don't Cry"

}}
{{hidden
| headercss = color:#ffffff; background: #FDA766; font-size: 100%; width: 95%;;
| contentcss = text-align: left; font-size: 100%; width: 95%;;
| header = Bikstok Røgsystem
| content =
"Tyveknægt"
"Græder for dem"
"Kugledans"
"Unger"
"Delirium"
"DK's koner"
"Firseren"
"Gongolagoz"
"Radio"
Encore
"Cigar"}}
}}

Arena

Avalon

Apollo

Pavilion

Gloria

References

External links

Roskilde Festival by year
2019 music festivals